The 1920 Campeonato Carioca, the fifteenth edition of that championship, kicked off on April 11, 1920 and ended on January 2, 1921. It was organized by LMDT (Liga Metropolitana de Desportos Terrestres, or Metropolitan Land Sports League). Ten teams participated. Flamengo won the title for the 3rd time. No teams were relegated.

Participating teams

System 
The tournament would be disputed in a double round-robin format, with the team with the most points winning the title.

Championship

References 

Campeonato Carioca seasons
Carioca